The 1989 Missouri Valley Conference men's basketball tournament was played after the conclusion of the 1988–1989 regular season at Levitt Arena on the campus of Wichita State University in Wichita, Kansas.

Bracket

References

1988–89 Missouri Valley Conference men's basketball season
Missouri Valley Conference men's basketball tournament
Missouri Valley Conference men's basketball tournament